Ammanford Association Football Club is a football club from Ammanford, Carmarthenshire in Wales. They play in the Cymru South. They are now based at the Recreation Ground in Ammanford. The club is affiliated to the Football Association of Wales (FAW), West Wales Football Association (WWFA), Welsh Football League and the Carmarthenshire Association Football League.

History
Football was played in the Ammanford and Betws parish in the 1920s by Ammanford Thursdays (who only played when the shops closed on Thursday afternoons). In the 1930s Ammanford Corinthians played on Betws Park. Betws Blackbirds football team was founded circa 1946, later joining the Carmarthenshire League. The club were elected to the Welsh league and in 1952 reached the final of the West Wales Amateur Cup. In the 1958–59 season they won promotion to the first division.

In 1960 the club changed their name to Ammanford Town, to avoid confusion with similarly named teams. They merged with Ammanford Athletic A.F.C. in 1992, changing their name to Ammanford A.F.C.
 
The club reached the fourth round of the Welsh Cup in 1991 and made it to the quarter finals in February 1999.

Squad

Honours

Footnotes

External links
 

Football clubs in Wales
Sport in Carmarthenshire
Association football clubs established in 1992
1992 establishments in Wales
football club
Welsh Football League clubs
Cymru South clubs